Lalliansanga Renthlei (born 5 June 1999) is an Indian professional footballer who plays as a midfielder for Rajasthan United in the I-League.

Career
After graduating from AIFF Elite Academy Samik was signed by Chennaiyin B in October 2017.  
He was sent on loan to Indian Arrows in 2019–20 season. He made his professional debut for the Indian Arrows side in the Arrow's first match of the 2019–20 season against Gokulam Kerala. He started and played till 68th minute as Indian Arrows lost 0–1.

Career statistics

Club

References

1999 births
Living people
People from Aizawl
Indian footballers
Indian Arrows players
Footballers from Mizoram
I-League players
India youth international footballers
Association football midfielders
I-League 2nd Division players
Chennaiyin FC B players
Sudeva Delhi FC players
Rajasthan United FC players